"Daddy" is a song by British rock band Coldplay from their eighth studio album Everyday Life. It was written by the band members and produced by The Dream Team, being released on 20 November 2019 along with "Champion of the World" in anticipation for the album's release. The track appears on the Sunrise side of the record.

Music video 
The music video for "Daddy" was animated by Aardman Animations and directed by Aardman's Åsa Lucander. The music video for the song was premiered on 20 November 2019 and features live action puppetry, digitally painted sets and 2D animation. The music video shows a girl who is lost at sea, alone in a rowing boat and sailing towards the unknown, symbolising the girl's memories of her father.

Personnel
 Chris Martin - vocals, piano
 Jonny Buckland - acoustic guitar, keyboard
 Guy Berryman - bass guitar
 Will Champion - percussion, keyboard

Charts

References 

2019 songs
Coldplay songs
Music videos by Aardman Animations
Songs written by Chris Martin
Songs written by Guy Berryman
Songs written by Jonny Buckland
Songs written by Will Champion